Chiu Wen-ta (born 21 July 1950) is a Taiwanese medical educator. He was the Minister of Health and Welfare (formerly the Minister of the Department of Health) of the Executive Yuan from 2011 to 2014.

Early career
Prior to joining politics, Chiu had served extensively at the Taipei Medical University. He began his career in 1985 as a lecturer, associate professor and end up as professor of the School of Medicine. In 1993, he became the dean of the School of Public Health and administrative deputy superintendent at the Taipei Medical University Hospital. In 1997, he became the superintendent of the university's Wan Fang Hospital. In 2000, he became the dean of the Graduate Institute of Injury Prevention and Control and the vice principal in 2004. In 2008 he became the superintendent of the university's Shuang Ho Hospital as well as principal of the university.

ROC Department of Health Ministry

2013 H7N9 flu virus outbreak

In early April 2013 during the H7N9 flu virus outbreak, Chiu gave a statement on behalf of the ROC Department of Health that they have classified H7N9 virus as category five notifiable disease. He also added that the department will raise the quarantine alert of the virus from Grade 2 to Grade 3. He also appointed Chang Feng-yee (張峰義) as the Director-General of the Centers for Disease Control.

ROC Health and Welfare Ministry

Ministry of Health and Welfare renaming from Department of Health
During the opening ceremony of the newly renamed Ministry of Health and Welfare from Department of Health on 23 July 2013, Chiu said that he looks forward for a society free from poverty and illness, and to foster maximum well-being of the Taiwanese people.

Chang Chi Foodstuff Factory Co cooking oil scandal
Responding to the scandal regarding the adulterating and mislabeling of cooking oil made by Chang Chi Foodstuff Factory Co. in October 2013, Chiu said that he will take full responsibility for cracking down on the 'black-hearted' food suppliers.

Resignation
Chiu resigned from his ministerial position on 3 October 2014 as a political responsibility due to the tainted lard oil scandal that had hit Taiwanese food industry which began in early September 2014. He ensured that there were no longer substandard lard oil products on shelves in Taiwan and that all of the responsible parties had been handed over to the prosecutor's office. He announced his resignation during a press conference at 8:00 p.m. held by the Ministry of Health and Welfare. Chiu said that he would return to his previous neurological research field.

References

1950 births
Living people
Taiwanese Ministers of Health and Welfare
Politicians of the Republic of China on Taiwan from Miaoli County
Academic staff of Taipei Medical University
Taiwanese educators
University of Pittsburgh alumni
Nihon University alumni
Chung Shan Medical University alumni